Blood Rapture is the fourth album by Swedish death metal band Vomitory. It was released in 2002 on Metal Blade.

Track listing 
 "Chaos Fury" – 3:09
 "Hollow Retribution" – 2:13
 "Blessed and Forsaken" – 3:44
 "Madness Prevails" – 3:51
 "Redeemed in Flames" – 4:23
 "Nailed, Quartered, Consumed" – 2:21
 "Eternity Appears" – 4:12
 "Rotting Hill" – 3:35
 "Blood Rapture" – 5:10

Personnel
 Erik Rundqvist – bass guitar, vocals
 Tobias Gustafsson – drums
 Ulf Dalegren – guitar
 Urban Gustafsson – guitar
Vomitory – production
Henrik Larsson – production, engineering, mixing, mastering

References 

2004 albums
Vomitory (band) albums
Metal Blade Records albums